Ralphs is an American supermarket chain in Southern California.  The largest subsidiary of Cincinnati-based Kroger, it is the oldest such chain west of the Mississippi River. Kroger also operates stores under the Food 4 Less and Foods Co. names in California.

History

Ralphs Grocery Company was founded in 1873 in Los Angeles by George Albert Ralphs and his brother, Walter Benjamin Ralphs. Ralphs teamed with S. A. Francis in 1873 to open the Ralphs & Francis store at 5th and Hill – an area which would become the Historic Core of the city in the early 20th century, but then a mostly residential area with many single-family houses. In 1875, Ralphs’ brother Walter bought out Francis’ share, and the business became the Ralphs Bros. Grocers, specializing in produce. The business boomed. In 1876 they constructed a two-story building at the southwest corner of Sixth and Spring.

In the 20th century, Ralphs became a grocery pioneer, offering self-service markets with checkout stands in distributed locations. The company employed notable architects in designing its stores, and the former Ralphs Grocery Store building built in 1929 in Westwood Village has been photographed by Ansel Adams, declared a Historic Cultural Monument, and listed on the National Register of Historic Places. In the 1980s, it created a chain of hybrid supermarket/warehouse stores called The Giant, which failed, but the concept returned with the company's merger with the Food 4 Less discount chain. In 1968, Ralphs was acquired by Federated Department Stores, based in Cincinnati.

In 1988, Canada-based Campeau Corporation launched a $4.2 billion hostile takeover of Federated, Ralphs' parent. Ralphs would then be put up for sale, with American Stores (owner of rival chain Lucky) making an offer.

In 1992, Federated, now known as Macy's, Inc., sold Ralphs to a group of owners, led by Edward J. DeBartolo Corporation, after filing for bankruptcy two years earlier in 1990. In 1994, Ralphs was acquired by the Yucaipa Companies for $1.5 billion. Yucaipa owned ABC Markets, Alpha Beta, and Cala Foods. Soon, all ABC Markets, Alpha Betas, and Boys Markets were rebranded as Ralphs. At the same time, Food 4 Less was merged with Ralphs. In 1997, Yucaipa sold Ralphs to Portland, Oregon based Fred Meyer, owner of several chains in the west. Soon, Ralphs Marketplace stores started opening in suburban areas; these stores are based on the Fred Meyer model but without apparel. At the same time, they also acquired the 57-store Hughes Family Markets chain. In October 1998, the parent company, Fred Meyer, merged with Kroger of Cincinnati, Ohio.

In 1999, Ralphs purchased about 30 Albertsons and Lucky stores, mostly in Northern California, as well as stores in the Central Coast region, and one store each in Bakersfield and Laguna Beach. The stores were divested as a result of the Albertsons and American Stores merger.

In 2005, Ralphs exited the Bakersfield market, closing 3 stores.

Ralphs operated in Northern California until January 2006, when they announced that all but one Ralphs in northern California would close. In August 2006, the one remaining Ralphs in northern California was given a 60-day notice of closure. Also, in August 2006, Ralphs finalized plans to sell eleven (of thirteen remaining) Cala-Bell Stores to Harley DeLano, who previously ran the chain.

On July 20, 2007, Ralphs opened a new  store on 9th and Hope Street in the South Park neighborhood of downtown Los Angeles. This was the first full-run supermarket downtown in 50 years. In 1950, Ralphs closed a store at 7th Street and Figueroa Street.

Today, Ralphs competes with Albertsons (including Vons) and Stater Bros. Its slogan is "Fresh Food, Low Prices." Ralphs is the current market share leader in Southern California.

2003–04 strike

Ralphs Grocery Company has contracts with the United Food and Commercial Workers, the largest grocery union in the United States. In late 2003 and early 2004, Ralphs locked out its workers who were members of the UFCW in sympathy with competitor Vons (owned by Safeway Inc.) in Southern California, after the UFCW had declared a strike against Vons. The issues in contract negotiations included healthcare benefits and wage structure, which the supermarkets contended were necessary to reduce costs and remain competitive in the face of the rise of discount chains like Walmart. In March 2004, the strike ended with a settlement regarded as a victory for the grocery chains—new hires would be on a much lower pay scale than existing workers and receive less generous health benefits.

On October 16, 2006, Ralphs agreed to pay $70 million to settle felony charges that it illegally rehired locked out employees using false names and Social Security numbers during the strike. Eligible UFCW members received $50 million of the settlement and the remainder was paid in fines to the federal government.

In popular culture
The photorealist painter Robert Cottingham depicted a Ralphs supermarket in his 1968 painting "Ralph's II", which has been displayed by the Milwaukee Art Museum.

The Coen Brothers' 1998 film The Big Lebowski opens with its main character, The Dude, played by Jeff Bridges,  walking through a Ralphs supermarket. Later in the film, The Dude is searched by the Malibu Chief of Police, who, upon finding his Ralphs Card, asks "Is this your only form of ID?" In a mortuary, the character Walter Sobchak complains about the high price of an urn to house the ashes of a friend. After asking the funeral director, "Is there a Ralphs around here?", the scene cuts to Walter overlooking the Pacific Ocean holding a Folgers Coffee can.

In the movie Messiah of Evil, one of the main characters, Laura, follows a mysterious figure into a deserted Ralphs supermarket, where she is chased, attacked, and eaten by zombies.

In The Powerpuff Girls, there is a grocery store called "Malph's".

A parody of Ralphs packaging was used as the cover for the 1986 album Album by Public Image Ltd.

Ralphs supermarket line of generic brand products were featured prominently in the 1984 film Repo Man; almost all products featured were donated by the supermarket.

Ralphs was the primary sponsor for the #11 car of Brett Bodine in the 2000–2001 NASCAR Winston Cup Series seasons.

A package of Ralphs green beans can be seen in a refrigerator in the closing moments of the Season 5 Episode 11 of The Practice. This was a likely error by the prop department, since the show takes place in Boston.

In the podcast radio drama Welcome to Night Vale, the chain is occasionally mentioned in the context of a "hole in the vacant lot out back of the Ralphs." This is in spite of a lack of confirmation or evidence that the town of Night Vale is located in Southern California.

In the 1992 film Forever Young, when Mel Gibson's character wakes up in 1992 to discover he has been cryogenically frozen since 1939, he goes to a pay telephone to call a friend from his past, across the street from the pay phone is a Ralphs store. Later when trying to tell someone where his friend from the past lived Gibson's character says "There's a place called Ralphs there now."

Ralphs generic products were featured in the Suicidal Tendencies music video for ”Institutionalized”.

References

External links
 
 Ralphs History
Ralphs Ends Its Attempt to Give Giant Stores a Separate Identity

1873 establishments in California
Companies based in Los Angeles County, California
American companies established in 1873
Retail companies established in 1873
Kroger
Private equity portfolio companies
Supermarkets based in California
Supermarkets of the United States
Companies that filed for Chapter 11 bankruptcy in 1990
1968 mergers and acquisitions
1992 mergers and acquisitions
1994 mergers and acquisitions
1997 mergers and acquisitions
Compton, California